Made is a self-improvement reality television series that aired on MTV. The series followed different people (mainly teenagers) who wanted to be "made" into things like singers, athletes, dancers, skateboarders, etc. They were joined by a "Made Coach", an expert in their chosen field, who tried to help them attain their goals over the course of several weeks. Made documented the process the teenagers underwent while trying to achieve their goals.

Seasons

Season 1

Season 2

Season 3

Season 4

Season 5

Season 6

Season 7

Season 8 (SuperMADE)

Season 9

Season 10

Season 11

Season 12

Season 13 (#DreamBigger)

Season 14

Season 15

References

External links
 
 MTV Made - Archive
 
 Photo Diary of MTV filming the Hip Hop Dancer episode of Made at the Columbia City Jazz Dance Company and School
 Made Turkey |REGAL 

MTV reality television series
2003 American television series debuts
2000s American reality television series
2010s American reality television series
2014 American television series endings
Television series about teenagers